Language festival may refer to:
 Adelaide Language Festival
 Language festival (Esperanto)
 Meitei language festival (Manipuri language festival) 

Languages
Festivals